Oregon Black Pioneers is a non-profit historical society focused on Black Oregonians, based in Salem, Oregon, United States.

History 
The organization was founded as “Northwest Black Pioneers” by Carole Davis, an educator from Seattle, and Oregon State Senator Jackie Winters in 1993. The group drew inspiration from the Northwest Black Pioneers in Seattle. The group later operated under the name “Oregon Northwest Black Pioneers” before officially settling on the name “Oregon Black Pioneers” in 2004. 

The organization’s early projects mainly focused on Black history education and presentations to Salem-area schools. After a few years of work, the volunteer group became mostly inactive. In 2004, Willie Richardson, a Salem business owner, school board member, and community advocate, gained support from other members to revitalize the group. Richardson served as the group's board president since then. In 2020, Executive Director Zachary Stocks became the organization's first paid staff member.

Historical markers project 
In 2007, Oregon Black Pioneers dedicated a granite marker to 43 Black people buried at the Salem Pioneer Cemetery.

Exhibitions 
 Perseverance
 A Community on the Move
 All Aboard! Railroading and Portland’s Black Community
 Racing to Change: Oregon’s Civil Rights Years
 Racing to Change: The Eugene Story

Publications

Awards 

 2009: David Duniway Award for Historic Preservation, from the Marion County Historical Society
 2010: Education Award from the Oregon Assembly for Black Affairs
 2010: Heritage Award from American Legacy Magazine
 2017: George McMath Historic Preservation Award

External links 

 Official Website

See also 
 History of African Americans in Oregon
 Willie Richardson

References 

Historical societies in Oregon
African-American history of Oregon